The sixth season of King of the Hill, originally aired on Sundays at 7:30–8:00p.m. (EST) on the Fox Broadcasting Company from November 11, 2001, to May 12, 2002. The Region 1 DVD was released on May 2, 2006.

Production
The showrunners for the season were Jonathan Aibel and Glenn Berger, who took over from Richard Appel, the showrunner of Season 5 and co-showrunner of Seasona 3-4 with Greg Daniels. Aibel and Berger had worked on the show since Season 1, and took yearly trips to Texas to better understand the show's setting, as they were not native to the area. Shortly after becoming showrunners in 2001, Berger commented to the Los Angeles Times that, "my writing partner and I are both Ivy League-educated Jewish guys from the New York area", adding that, "for most of the country, it’s a really cool, smart show about people they know. For New York and L.A., it’s like an anthropological study." Aibel and Berger departed in late 2001, as a result of unspecified tensions behind the scenes. Greg Daniels temporarily ran the show again following Aibel and Berger's departure, and the duo would eventually be replaced by John Altschuler and Dave Krinsky for Season 7 and beyond.

Reception
In November 2001, Hal Boedeker of the Orlando Sentinel gave the season opener "Bobby Goes Nuts" a positive review, and described Fox's programming that night as "highly uneven: a clever King of the Hill, a mediocre Simpsons, an amusing Malcolm in the Middle and a pointless X-Files." Boedeker went on to write, "the sixth-season opener of King of the Hill manages the considerable feat of being more diverting than The Simpsons, and it does it with one of the hoariest bits of humor: the kick in the groin." The New York Post'''s Austin Smith praised the season final "Returning Japanese" in May 2002, writing that, "the episode figures to be the best of the season finales the networks have in store this week – cleverer by far than this Thursday’s baby hijinks on NBC’s Friends and Will & Grace. Those plotlines sound as desperate as this Tuesday’s episode of Frasier, in which Frasier stumbles into bed with Roz." Smith noted that King of the Hill "wasn’t always easy to love at first, [but] today – six seasons later – stands out as one of the most creative and best-written shows on TV."

In his 2006 review for the DVD release, IGN's Tal Blevins labelled it "a great season with no real stinkers." Blevins praised the episode "Bobby Goes Nuts", commenting that it "includes one of the most memorable lines ever uttered on television." In his review of the Season 6 DVD, Jesse Hassenger of PopMatters'' described "Bobby Goes Nuts" as one of "the show’s finest episodes."  Hassenger also observed that, "by season six, Peggy’s scales have tipped towards buffoonery; she essentially plays the bumbling, dim husband role. This role reversal is potentially clever, especially when Peggy’s decency, like Hank’s, is allowed to shine through."

Episodes

References

2001 American television seasons
2002 American television seasons
King of the Hill 06